Robert K. Geiger (October 27, 1923 - June 1, 2013) was an American admiral. He served as Chief of Naval Research from 1975 to 1978.

References

External links
 Buderi, Robert (2013): Naval innovation for the 21st century: the Office of Naval Research since the end of the Cold War (p. 101). Annapolis: Naval Institute Press . Retrieved 30 July 2014

1923 births
2013 deaths
United States Navy rear admirals